An amphora (/ˈæmfərə/; Ancient Greek: ἀμφορεύς was the unit of measurement of volume in the Greco-Roman era. The term amphora comes from ancient Greece where people used a tall jar looking container with two opposed handles near the top mostly made of ceramic. Amphora literally means "two handled".

An amphora is equal to 48 sextarii, which is about 34 litres or 9 gallons in the US customary units and 7.494 gallons in the imperial system of units.

The Roman amphora quadrantal (~25.9 litres), was one cubic-pes, holding 80 libra of wine, and was used to measure liquids, bulk goods, the cargo capacity of ships, and the production of vineyards. Along with other standardized Roman measures and currency) gave an added advantage to Roman commerce. The related amphora capitolina standard, was kept in the temple of Jupiter on the Capitoline Hill in Rome.

A typical Greek amphora, based on a cubic-pous, was ~38.3 litres, The Greek talent, an ancient unit of weight was roughly the mass of the amount of water that would fill an amphora.

The French amphora, also called the minot de Paris, is 1/8 muid or one cubic pied du roi and therefore ~34 litres.

References

Units of volume
Ancient Greek units of measurement
Ancient Roman units of measurement